Bruce John Kuczenski (born February 3, 1961) is a retired American professional basketball player. He was a 6'10" (208 cm) 230 lb (104 kg) power forward/center born in Bristol, Connecticut and played collegiately at the University of Connecticut from 1979–1983.

Kuczenski was selected with the 12th pick of the 3rd round of the 1983 NBA Draft by the New Jersey Nets. In his only NBA season, 1983-84, he played with the Nets, Philadelphia 76ers and Indiana Pacers, playing 15 games, averaging 1.9 points and 1.5 rebounds per game. He also played in the CBA for the Puerto Rico Coquis and for the Albany Patroons.

After his NBA and CBA career he played six years in Europe. Kuczenski signed with Valladolid of Spain, where he averaged 12.8 points and 5.4 rebonds per contest. After a stint in Belgium, he joined Reims of the French Nationale 1A league: In 30 contests of the 1987-88 season, he scored 20.8 points, while grabbing 8.7 rebounds a game. In 1988, Kuczenski moved to Fribourg Olympic Basket. In the 1988-89 season, he pulled down 15.5 rebounds per contest. He left the team because of an injury in fall 1989.

Notes

External links
NBA stats @ basketballreference.com
UConn Hoop Legends: Bruce Kuczenski

1961 births
Living people
Albany Patroons players
American expatriate basketball people in Belgium
American expatriate basketball people in France
American expatriate basketball people in Italy
American expatriate basketball people in Spain
American expatriate basketball people in Switzerland
American men's basketball players
Basketball players from Connecticut
CB Valladolid players
Centers (basketball)
Indiana Pacers players
Liga ACB players
New Jersey Nets draft picks
New Jersey Nets players
People from Bristol, Connecticut
Philadelphia 76ers players
Power forwards (basketball)
Puerto Rico Coquis players
RBC Pepinster players
Reims Champagne Basket players
Sportspeople from Hartford County, Connecticut
UConn Huskies men's basketball players